The Birmingham Science Fiction Group (BSFG), also known as the "Brum Group", held its first meeting on 25 June 1971. It runs regular meetings in Birmingham, England, where SF fans can meet one another and professionals in the field in a friendly environment, and has organised the annual SF convention Novacon since 1972.

History
There were at least two previous versions of the Birmingham Science Fiction Group prior to the launch of the current incarnation in 1971 (many of those involved had been members of the 1960s fan scene, described in Peter Weston's hardback memoir With Stars in My Eyes).

Initially, it shared Britain's second city with the Aston Science Fiction Group, which hosted the first Novacon that same year; by 1972, the Brum Group had become the dominant SF gathering in the region and took over Novacon from that year onwards. In contrast to many of its contemporaries, the BSFG had a formal constitution (copied in part from a local branch of the Young Conservatives) and held formal meetings each month, usually with a guest speaker. As well as issuing a monthly newsletter, the Brum Group also published one edition of its own fanzine in 1977, Meta, co-edited by Noel Chidwick, Steve Green and Paul R Harris.

In January 1983, Peter Weston won the election for BSFG chair on a platform of re-engaging the Group with wider British fandom; parties were hosted at conventions and an amateur press association set up (APA-B, later known as The Organisation). The last of those projects detached within 18 months, but the BSFG still runs Novacon and has organised three one-off mini-conventions (the 10th Anniversary Con in 1981, Fifteencon in 1986 and Twentycon in 1991; the last was viewed as a financial disaster and the thirtieth anniversary was marked with a small post-meeting party). In the early 1980s, the BSFG was also involved with a media event, Filmcon, but eventually withdrew its support due to concerns over the organisation; Filmcon was cancelled.

Notable members and officers
Honorary presidents Brian Aldiss, the late Harry Harrison & the late Bob Shaw
Steve Green
David A. Hardy
Co-founder Rog Peyton
Martin Tudor
Co-founder Peter Weston

References

1. Then #4 by Rob Hansen, 1988: "Of more significance to fandom was that a fortnight later, on Friday 25 June [1971], the newly-reborn Birmingham SF Group held its inaugural meeting in the George Room of Birmingham's Imperial Hotel. [..] From the outset, the BSFG was intended to be more sercon than most groups with formal meetings and guest speakers. [..] The constitution of the new model BSFG was based on that of the Young Conservatives by Peter Weston and it was to this, many years later, that he attributed the group's endurance."
2. Conrunner #4, 1986, editorial by Ian Sorensen: "I don't feel qualified to speak on the subject of the good old Novacons of yore but I do think that the current level of disorganisation [..] and the lack of direction is going to rebound on the Brum group who keep it going for the sake of the cash it generates: one year it will simply make a whopping great loss."
3. Apparatchik #69, 1996, column by Steve Green: "I first crossed paths with the Brum Group back in February 1977, when it was just six years old and arguably at the height of its powers [..] the grim truth remains that it'll be a miracle if the UK's most famous SF group survives into the next century in its present form."
4. AstroArt, David Hardy's official website: "David has been a member of the (Birmingham SF Group) since 1973, and has held the position of chairman four times (three years consecutively), Secretary, Publicity Officer, and Newsletter Editor (also four years). (..) As Artist Guest of Honour at Novacon (the Brum Group's annual SF convention) in 2000, David even took time to produce a 'Rolf Harris-style' painting in front of the audience."
5. Ansible #134, September 1998: "Martin Tudor fled the horrors of 7½ years editing the Brum Group newsletter; a new incumbent is sought...."
6. Checkpoint #21, 1972, review by editor Peter Roberts: "Edited by Peter Weston, [..] Speculation is Britain's best known fanzine, five times a Hugo nominee and considered as the foremost magazine of serious SF criticism in the world."

External links
Birmingham SF Group website
Complete list of formal meetings from 1971 on
Novacon 37 website
BSFG entry in Encyclopedia Of British SF Jargon
THEN – History of British Science Fiction – many references to group, including launch on 25 June 1971
With Stars in My Eyes:My Adventures in British Fandom by Peter Weston. Publ. Sep 2004 by NESFA Press. 
Prolapse #3, published 2006, with separate articles on BSFG activities in the mid-1980s and Apa-B, the group's amateur press association
UK SF Book News links to notable BSFG activities
Ansible News – many references to Group
Review of Alastair Reynolds Understanding Space and Time, published by the Birmingham Science Fiction Group

Science fiction organizations
British science fiction
Culture in Birmingham, West Midlands
Organizations established in 1971
1971 establishments in England